Svetlana Khristoforovna Grozdova (born 29 January 1959 in Rostov on Don) is a retired Soviet Russian gymnast.

She started training in gymnastics at age 8 and was coached by Russian gymnastics coach Ruslan Lavrov in a gym in Rostov-on-Don. She was a member of the Soviet Union's 1976 Olympics Gold medal-winning gymnastics team alongside Maria Filatova, Nellie Kim, Elvira Saadi, Ludmilla Tourischeva and Olga Korbut.

In 1974 and 1976, she was the Moscow News All Around champion. She was awarded the Order of the Badge of Honor in 1976. In 1980 she left the world of competitive gymnastics and took up sports acrobatics and was competing in it by the mid-1980s.

Her best event was the balance beam. Despite not winning any Olympic medals in this event, she was a pro at wowing the crowds at USSR gymnastics exhibitions around the world with her tremendous flexibility and mesmerising balance on her hands. She had an unusually flexible, rubber-like spine which allowed her to perform walkovers along the 4" (10 cm) width of the balance beam, and to do a split handstand at the very end of the beam and touching the beam with her foot behind her head.

Achievements (non-Olympic)

References

1959 births
Living people
Soviet female artistic gymnasts
Olympic gold medalists for the Soviet Union
Olympic gymnasts of the Soviet Union
Olympic medalists in gymnastics
Gymnasts at the 1976 Summer Olympics
Sportspeople from Rostov-on-Don

Medalists at the 1976 Summer Olympics